The Călimănel is a right tributary of the river Mureș in Transylvania, Romania. It discharges into the Mureș near Toplița.

References

Rivers of Romania
Rivers of Harghita County